Kevin O'Sullivan is a Paralympic medalist from New Zealand who competed in alpine skiing.  He competed in the 1994 Winter Paralympics where he won a bronze medal in the Slalom, and in the 1998 Winter Paralympics where he won a gold medal in the Super-G.

References

External links 
 
 

Living people
New Zealand male alpine skiers
Year of birth missing (living people)
Alpine skiers at the 1994 Winter Paralympics
Alpine skiers at the 1998 Winter Paralympics
Paralympic bronze medalists for New Zealand
Paralympic gold medalists for New Zealand
Medalists at the 1994 Winter Paralympics
Medalists at the 1998 Winter Paralympics
Paralympic medalists in alpine skiing
Paralympic alpine skiers of New Zealand